

Calling formats
To call in Chad, the following format is used: 
 yy yy xx xx - Calls within Chad
 +235 yy yy xx xx - Calls from outside Chad
The NSN length is eight digits.

List of area codes in Chad

References

Chad
Telecommunications in Chad
Telephone numbers